Baron Slavko Cuvaj de Ivanska (26 February 1851 – 31 January 1931) was a Croatian politician who was the Ban of Croatia-Slavonia and royal commissioner for Austria-Hungary.

He was appointed in January 1912, when anti-Habsburg sentiments were on the rise in Croatia, often manifesting in sympathies for Serbia and calls for creation of Yugoslavia. Cuvaj tried to curb those trends by series of decrees directed at curbing press freedom, limiting rights of assembly and local autonomy. This created backlash in the form of strikes and demonstrations, while some young radicals engaged in terrorism. Cuvaj himself was target of two assassination attempts in 1912, the first being conducted by group including young August Cesarec. Cuvaj was relieved from his post after the Second Balkan War, receiving a title of baron for his services.

References

1851 births
1930 deaths
People from Bjelovar
Bans of Croatia
Croatian Austro-Hungarians
Barons of Croatia
19th-century Croatian nobility
20th-century Croatian nobility